Dimitar Buynozov (7 November 1935 – 25 November 1995) was a Bulgarian actor. He appeared in 13 films between 1957 and 1991.

Filmography

External links

1935 births
1995 deaths
Bulgarian male film actors
People from Veliko Tarnovo
20th-century Bulgarian male actors